Kim Kwang-jin (May 12, 1927 - February 27, 1997) was a North Korean general and politician. He held the rank of Vice Marshal.

Biography
Born May 12, 1927 in Pyongyang. Before liberation, he was a worker. He served as an artillery commander during the Korean War, and participated in military education at Kim Il-Sung Military University from September 1954.
He graduated the Mangyongdae Revolutionary School. During the Korean War, he built his major as an artillery commander, commanding the People's Army, entering Seoul and advancing to the Nakdong River.

After being appointed as an artillery commander and corps commander in the position of lieutenant general in 1969, he was known as the number one in the artillery division for more than 10 years until he was appointed to the military vice of the General Staff Department in October 1980. Since he was elected as member of the Supreme People's Assembly, North Korea's unicameral parliament for the 5th Convocation in December 1972, he was re-elected to the 7th, 8th and the 9th convocations. He was elected a candidate member of the 6th Central Committee at the 6th Congress of the Workers' Party of Korea in October 1980 and a full member of the Central Committee of the Party in July 1984. In April 1984, he was appointed commander of the 5th Corps, and in December of the same year, he was appointed Vice Minister of the People's Armed Forces.

He contributed greatly to the implementation of the Juche suggested by Kim Jong-il. In September 1990, he participated as the North Korean representative eight times, from the first inter-Korean high-level talks to the eighth high-level talks, and visited the Blue House.
At the 7th inter-Korean high-level talks in May 1992, he was widely known in South Korea as an important figure on the North side of high-level talks, including taking the position of chairman of the Military Joint Commission. After being promoted to the Vice Marshal rank in April 1992, he was selected as a member of the Central Military Commission of the Workers' Party of Korea in March 1995.

In August 1995, the year of the death of the Minister of People's Armed Forces O Jin-u, ``The People's Army is Kim Jong-il's army, and in any case, let's protect him with loyalty'' in the WPK mouthpiece, urged the entire military to loyalty to Kim Jong-il. 

In October 1995, he was appointed as the first deputy head of the Ministry of People's Armed Forces, and at the same time he was awarded the Kim Il-sung Medal. 

He died on February 27, 1997. At the time of his death, he served as the first vice-minister of the Ministry of People's Armed Forces, a member of the National Defense Commission, and a military member of the Party's Central Military Commission. During his life he was decorated Kim Il-sung medals, the title of Hero of the Republic, several Order of the National Flag first-class orders, and Free Independence Medal. Kim was given a state funeral. His funeral committee consisted of Ri Ul-sol, Jo Myong-rok, Kim Yong-chun, and others.

References

1927 births	
1997 deaths
Members of the Supreme People's Assembly
Workers' Party of Korea politicians
North Korean generals
Korean independence activists
People from Pyongyang
People of 88th Separate Rifle Brigade